Alan Averill (a.k.a. A.A. Nemtheanga; born 26 August 1975) is an Irish musician most notable for his vocal duties for the folk/black metal band Primordial. He has also participated in several side projects, including Void of Silence, Blood Revolt, and Twilight of the Gods.

Life and career
Averill was raised in Sutton on Dublin's Northside and attended Mount Temple Comprehensive School. Averill joined Primordial in August 1991 after seeing an advertisement posted by the band in a local music store.

He was the vocalist for the doom metal band Void of Silence and sung on the band's third album, Human Antithesis, before departing in 2009.

Averill traveled to Canada early to record vocals for "Indoctrine", the debut album from Blood Revolt with Vermin and J. Read (Axis of Advance, Conqueror). The album was released by Profound Lore and Invictus in late 2010.

He also fronts Twilight of the Gods, a supergroup, originally intended as a live-only Bathory tribute, that includes drummer Nicholas Barker (ex-Cradle of Filth, ex-Dimmu Borgir, ex-Testament, ex-Exodus), guitarist Rune Eriksen (Aura Noir, ex-Mayhem), guitarist Patrik Lindgren (Thyrfing), and bassist Frode Glesnes (Einherjer). The band released its debut, Fire on the Mountain, on 27 September 2013 on Season of Mist.

Averill also contributes to other aspects of the music industry. In 2008, he received a Journalism degree from Dublin City University and is a staff writer for Zero Tolerance magazine. In 2010, he started working as an A&R representative for Metal Blade Records and formed the Poison Tongue Records imprint.

Discography

With Primordial
Imrama (full-length, 1995)
Primordial / Katatonia (split, 1997)
A Journey's End (full-length, 1998)
The Burning Season (EP, 1999)
Spirit the Earth Aflame (full-length, 2000)
Storm Before Calm (full-length, 2002)
The Gathering Wilderness (full-length, 2005)
Primordial / Mael Mórdha (split, 2005)
To the Nameless Dead (full-length, 2007)
Redemption at the Puritan's Hand (full-length, 2011)
Where Greater Men Have Fallen (full-length, 2014)
Exile Amongst the Ruins (full-length, 2018)

With Blood Revolt
Indoctrine (full-length, 2010)

With Dread Sovereign
All Hell's Martyrs (full-length, 2013)
For Doom the Bell Tolls (full-length, 2017)
Alchemical Warfare (full length, 2021)

With Plagued
Plagued / Trimonium (split, 2007)

With Twilight of the Gods
Fire on the Mountain (full-length, 2013)

With Void of Silence
Human Antithesis (full-length, 2004)

As a guest or session musician
Rom 5:12 – Marduk (full-length, 2007)
Evocation I - The Arcane Dominion – Eluveitie (full-length, 2009)
Rise of the Bastard Deities – Morphosis (full-length, 2009)
Aealo – Rotting Christ (full-length, 2010)
Vuur van Vurzet - Heidevolk (full-length, 2018)
Ächtung, Baby! - Rome
Mother Bury Your Sons - Me and that Man

References

External links

1975 births
People educated at Mount Temple Comprehensive School
Musicians from Dublin (city)
Black metal singers
20th-century Irish male singers
21st-century Irish male singers
Living people